The Heart of Asia is a programming block of GMA Network composed of Filipino-dubbed Asian dramas. On June 9, 2003, My MVP Valentine was the first Asian drama aired on the network. The Asian drama block has the highest number of acquired dramas aired in the Philippines for the past two decades.

History
Asian dramas are popular in the Philippines since the early 2000s. Huge demands from Filipino viewers prompted Philippine TV stations to import Chinese and South Korean programs.

Riding the Korean wave that swept Asian countries since the 2000s, GMA aired a significant number of Korean TV dramas, beginning with Bright Girl. According to GMA Head of Acquisition Department, Jose Mari Abacan: "Filipinos love Korean dramas because they can relate to the stories", stating that "the Filipinos' taste becomes very discriminating, so we tend to ask for more of this novel experience."

Current programs
Note: Titles are listed in alphabetical order.
 Are We Alright? 
 Art of The Spirit 
 Bad Romeo 
 Bai Ling Tan 
 Codename: Yong Pal 
 Flames of Vengeance 
 General and I 
 God of Lost Fantasy 
 Her Bucket List 
 Love Revolution 
 Miss the Dragon 
 My Husband in Law 
 One the Woman 
 Queen Seondeok 
 Romance of Dog and Monkey 
 Room No. 9 
 The Last Promise 
 Tomorrow's Cantabile

Upcoming programs
Note: Titles are listed in alphabetical order.
 Kingmaker: The Change of Destiny  
What's Wrong with Secretary Kim 
City Hunter 
Perfect Match 
Now, We Are Breaking Up 
One Ordinary Day 
Game of Outlaws 
Lovers of the Red Sky 
Yumi's Cells 
My Ambulance 
The King's Affection 
My Roommate is a Gumiho 
The Long Ballad 
Secret Royal Inspector and Joy 
Dali and the Cocky Prince 
Shooting Stars 
Love Circle of Resentment 
Two Brothers 
Eve 
Love and Deception 
Beauty and a Guy 
Jinxed at First Love 
Astrophile 
Jirisan 
The Forbidden Flower 
Curtain Call 
Unnie is Alive 
The Third Charm 
Watcher 
Entertainer 
Entourage 
Abyss 
Dorm at Your Service 
Catch the Ghost 
Angel Eyes 
Pachinko 
Faith 
That Winter, the Wind Blows 
Tamra, the Island 
The King 2 Hearts 
My Girlfriend Is a Gumiho 
The Love Story of Kang Chi 
A Korean Odyssey 
Doctor Crush 
The K2 
Heartstring 
The Fallen Leaf 
Perfect and Casual 
Hello Mr. Gu 
Crush 
Once We Get Married 
Unforgettable Love 
Love in Contract 
My Girlfriend is an Alien

Previous programs
Note: The following is a list of Asian dramas that originally aired first on each platforms. Reruns are excluded in this section.

GMA Network
2000s

 My MVP Valentine 
 Poor Prince 
 Lavender 
 Bright Girl 
 Endless Love: Autumn In My Heart 
 My Love, Cindy 
 Secretly In Love 
 Love Talks 
 Beautiful Days 
 Marmalade Boy 
 Funny Wild Girl 
 Endless Love II: Winter Sonata 
 At Dolphin Bay 
 Starry, Starry Night 
 Loving You 
 Irene 
 Love Letter 
 Love Storm 
 Guardian Angel 
 Endless Love III: Summer Scent 
 Twin Sisters 
 Snow Angel 
 White Book of Love 
 Stairway To Heaven 
 Glass Shoes 
 Full House 
 All About Eve 
 Sweet 18 
 Señorita Mei Mei 
 Attic Cat 
 Friends 
 All For Love 
 Hotelier 
 Sassy Girl Chun-hyang 
 My 19 Year Old Sister-in-Law 
 Romance 
 Frog Prince 
 Jewel in the Palace 
 Date With Tiffany 
 18 VS. 29 
 First Love of a Royal Prince 
 Sad Love Song 
 Le Robe de Marriage 
 My Name Is Kim Sam Soon 
 Snow White, Sweet Love 
 House Husband 
 Gokusen 
 Love of the Condor Heroes 
 A Second Proposal 
 Good Luck! 
 Yellow Handkerchief 
 Love Story in Harvard 
 Miss Kim's Million Dollar Quest 
 A Rosy Life 
 Into the Sun 
 Jumong 
 Gokusen II 
 One Million Roses 
 My Strange Family 
 Love Truly 
 Hana Yori Dango 
 Love in Heaven 
 Great Teacher Onizuka 
 Meteor Garden 
 Foxy Lady 
 Lovers in Prague 
 Couple or Trouble 
 Hwang Jini 
 Meteor Rain 
 Meteor Garden II 
 Come Back Soon-Ae 
 Coffee Prince 
 Hana Yori Dango II 
 Devil Beside Me 
 Dating Now 
 Hana Kimi 
 The Legend 
 Witch Yoo Hee 
 Dalja's Spring 
 Hello My Lady 
 Sweet Spy 
 My Husband's Woman 
 Be Strong, Geum-soon! 
 Sakurano 
 Money War 
 Wanted Perfect Family 
 Love at the Corner 
 Fated To Love You 
 Chil Princesses 
 Gokusen III 
 Nodame Cantabile 
 One Liter of Tears 
 Cruel Love 
 Game About Love 
 Shining Inheritance 
 Last Romance 
 Freestyle 
 On Air 
 Queen Seondeok 
 East of Eden 
 Temptation of Wife 
 The Baker King 
 Secret Garden 
 Playful Kiss 
 Gourmet 
 Big Thing 
 Cinderella Man 
 Love You 
 Dong Yi 
 It Started with a Kiss 
 Iris 
 Chuno: The Slave Hunter 
 It Started with a Kiss 2 
 Lie to Me 
 Lee San: The Wind Of The Palace 
 Moon Embracing the Sun 
 Smile, Dong Hae 
 Angel's Temptation 
 The Princess' Man 
 The Greatest Love 
 Big 
 Unexpected You 
 Queen And I 
 I Do, I Do 
 Padam Padam 
 My Daughter, Seoyoung 
 The Innocent Man 
 Fabulous Boys 
 A 100-Year Legacy 
 Tale of Arang: A Tale Without End 
 My Love from the Star 
 Mischievous Kiss: Love in Tokyo 
 The Master's Sun 
 Return of the Wife 
 Secret Love 
 I Hear Your Voice 
 May Queen 
 Prime Minister and I 
 Empress Ki 
 Women in the Sun 
 Future's Choice 
 Fall in Love With Me 
 Two Mothers 
 King of Ambition 
 The Mermaid 
 Birth of a Beauty 
 The King's Doctor 
 Pinocchio 
 Reply 1997 
 Legendary Women 
 Someone Like You 
 Ice Adonis 
 The Producers 
 Temptation 
 Carmina 
 You're The Best! 
 Hi School Love On 
 Love Me, Heal Me 
 Secret Hotel 
 I Heart You Doc 
 Mamaw-in-Law 
 Oh My Venus 
 Descendants of the Sun 
 The Healer 
 Angel's Revenge 
 Oh My Ghost 
 Codename: Yong Pal 
 The Big One 
 Pretty Woman 
 Ice Fantasy 
 Scarlet Heart 
 Moribito: Guardian of the Spirit 
 Street Fighter: Assassin's Fist 
 Innocent Defendant 
 Moribito II: The Anguish of the Destroyers 
 All About My Mom 
 Mirror of the Witch 
 Saimdang: Soulmates Across Time 
 Let's Fight Ghost! 
 My Daughter, Geum Sa-weol 
 Strong Girl Bong-soon 
 Starry Night, Starry Sea 
 Crimson Girl 
 My Secret Romance 
 The Romantic Doctor 
 The Maid 
 Chibi Maruko-chan 
 Fight for My Way 
 Fighter of Destiny 
 Bride of the Water God 
 Cinderella and the Four Knights 
 You're My Destiny 
 Moribito Final 
 Wings of Love 
 Princess Hours (Thai version) 
 The Fox Fairy 
 While You Were Sleeping 
 Love O2O 
 Marriage Contract 
 Switch 
 The Legend of Zu 
 Woman of Dignity 
 Waves of Life 
 Don't Dare to Dream 
 Something About 1% 
 Rakshasa Street 
 My Golden Life 
 Whisper 
 Fire of Eternal Love 
 Cheese in the Trap 
 My Sassy Girl 
 The Crown Princess 
 Love in Trouble 
 Ugly Duckling 
 Are You Human? 
 Queen of Mystery 
 Aladdin: You Would've Heard the Name 
 U-Prince Series 
 Emperor: Ruler of the Mask 
 Mr. Sunshine 
 Sky Castle 
 Taste of Love 
 Love Alert 
 Wicked Angel 
 Angel's Last Mission 
 The Last Empress 
 Misty 
 Madam Pushy and I 
 My Love from Another Star 
 VIP 
 Fates & Furies 
 The Romantic Doctor 2 
 The Blooming Treasure 
 The Desire 
 The Penthouse 
 The Gifted 
 Her Private Life 
 Lie After Lie 
 Game of Affection 
 The Sand Princess 
 The Penthouse 2 
 Oh My Baby 
 God of Lost Fantasy 
 Scripting Your Destiny 
 When the Weather Is Fine 
 Tale of the Nine Tailed 
 Love Beyond Time 
 Mr. Queen 
 The Gifted: Graduation 
 Bad Genius: The Series 
 My Husband in Law 
 The Penthouse 3 
 Backstreet Rookie 
 Douluo Continent 
 Princess Hours 
 One the Woman 
 The Herbal Master 
 The Witch's Diner 
 The Maid 
 Man of Vengeance 
 Show Window: The Queen's House 
 The Skywatcher 
 Prophecy of Love 
 My Forever Sunshine 
 Miss the Dragon 
 About Time 
 Goblin: The Lonely and Great God 
 To Me, It's Simply You 
 Ghost Doctor 
 Put Your Head on My Shoulder 
 The Wolf 
 My Shy Boss 
 Another Miss Oh 
 What's Wrong with Secretary Kim 
 Ancient Love Poetry 
 You Are My Heartbeat 
 Poong, the Joseon Psychiatrist 
 46 Days

GTV 

 Heart of Asia Presents: Girl Detective 
 Marrying My Daughter Twice 
 When a Snail Falls in Love 
 The Liar and His Lover 
 The Good Manager 
 Into the World Again 
 Hit the Top 
 Price of Passion 
 Man X Man 
 Hidden Love 
 Nakee 
 Legend of Fuyao 
 My Absolute Boyfriend 
 Secret Seven 
 Extraordinary You 
 Rising Sun 
 Where Stars Land 
 Boys Over Flowers 
 Secret Love Online 
 Pure Intention 
 Love Actually 
 Two Spirits' Love 
 The Love Knot 
 Prince of Wolf 
 In Time With You 
 When Duty Calls 
 Mr. Merman 
 Finding Love 
 The Frog Prince (Thai version) 
 Hello From The Other Side 
 Girl Next Room 
 Doctor John 
 The Legend of the Blue Sea 
 Flower Ever After 
 The Best Ending 
 Me Always You 
 Ending Again 
 Behind Your Smile 
 Pumpkin Time! 
 Signal 
 Love in the Moonlight 
 Terror Newspaper 
 Nabi, My Stepdarling 
 Beauty Boy 
 The Merciless Judge 
 Boy For Rent 
 Hogu's Love 
 Delayed Justice

Heart of Asia Channel

 Princess Weiyoung 
 Art of The Spirit 
 The Heirs

QTV / Q

 All In 
 Wish Upon A Star 
 Heaven's Coin 
 Golden Bowl 
 Star 
 Toast 
 Super Rookie 
 Sorry, I Love You 
 Over the Green Fields 
 Phoenix 
 Hi Fly 
 The Always The Two of Us 
 Pawnshop No. 8 
 Emperor of the Sea 
 Mice Loves Rice 
 Sound of Colors 
 Green Forest 
 Burning Heaven 
 Express Boy 
 Love Contract 
 City of Sky 
 Hello, God! 
 April Kisses 
 The Snow Queen 
 Love Story of A Star 
 My Fair Princess 
 Typhoon in That Summer 
 Golden Apple 
 Top on the Forbidden City 
 Farewell to Sorrow 
 Sunrise 
 Kung Fu Soccer 
 Heaven's Tree 
 Hong Kong Express 
 Fashion 70's 
 Beach Boys 
 Reaching for the Stars 
 Silence 
 Unforgettable Affection 
 Summer Beach 
 Single Again 
 Let's Dance 
 Magic Love 
 Magicians of Love 
 My Lucky Star 
 The 100th Bride 
 Wish To See You Again 
 The Legend of Bruce Lee 
 Beautiful Life 
 Love Generation 
 Nobuta wo Produce 
 Perfect Woman 
 Secret Lovers 
 Hearts of 19 
 Song of the Prince 
 Alone in Love 
 One Fine Day 
 Beethoven Virus 
 I Love You 
 Night After Night 
 Formidable Rivals 
 Celebrity Sweetheart 
 Land of Wind 
 Worlds Within

Local adaptations
The political success of Korean dramas prompted GMA Network to do local adaptations.

Aired
 Ako si Kim Samsoon 
 All About Eve 
 Stairway to Heaven 
 Full House 
 Endless Love (based on Autumn in My Heart) 
 Coffee Prince 
 Temptation of Wife 
 My Love From the Star 
 Descendants of the Sun 
 Start-Up

Coming Soon
 Fates and Furies  
 Shining Inheritance  
 Boys Over Flowers 
 Gokusen

References

2003 establishments in the Philippines
South Korean television series
Television programming blocks